TosMIC (toluenesulfonylmethyl isocyanide) is an organic compound with the formula CH3C6H4SO2CH2NC. The molecule contains both sulfonyl and isocyanide groups. It is a colourless solid that, unlike many isocyanides, is odorless. It is prepared by dehydration of the related formamide derivative. It is used in the Van Leusen reaction which is used to convert aldehydes to nitriles or in the preparation of oxazoles and imidazoles. The versatility of TosMIC  in organic synthesis has been documented.  It is a fairly strong carbon acid, with an estimated pKa of 14 (compared to 29 for methyl tolyl sulfone), the isocyano group acting as an electron acceptor of strength comparable to an ester group.

Further reading

References

Isocyanides
Reagents for organic chemistry
p-Tosyl compounds